Mavrodendri is a village and a community of the Kozani municipality. Before the 2011 local government reform it was part of the municipality of Dimitrios Ypsilantis, of which it was a municipal district and the seat. The 2011 census recorded 1,059 inhabitants in the community.

References

Populated places in Kozani (regional unit)